Aldo-keto reductase family 1 member B10 is an enzyme that in humans is encoded by the AKR1B10 gene.

This gene encodes a member of the aldo/keto reductase superfamily, which consists of more than 40 known enzymes and proteins. This member can efficiently reduce aliphatic and aromatic aldehydes, and it is less active on hexoses. It is highly expressed in adrenal gland, small intestine, and colon, and may play an important role in liver carcinogenesis.

References

External links

Further reading

External links 
 PDBe-KB provides an overview of all the structure information available in the PDB for Human Aldo-keto reductase family 1 member B10 (AKR1B10)]

EC 1.1.1